MDCalc is a free online medical reference for healthcare professionals that provides point-of-care clinical decision-support tools, including medical calculators, scoring systems, and algorithms. MDCalc is also a mobile and web app. The decision-support tools are based on published clinical research, and MDCalc’s content is written by physician authors.

History
MDCalc was founded by two emergency physicians, Graham Walker, MD, and Joseph Habboushe, MD, MBA, and provides over 500 medical calculators and other clinical decision-support tools.

The MDCalc.com website was launched in 2005. In 2016, MDCalc launched an iOS app, followed by an Android app in 2017. A 2017 survey estimated 65% of U.S. attending physicians and 79% of U.S. resident physicians use MDCalc regularly.

References

External links
 Official Website

Medical websites
Health information technology companies
American medical websites